Robert Alexander Pérez Jiménez (born June 4, 1969) is a Venezuelan former professional baseball outfielder who played for the Toronto Blue Jays, Seattle Mariners, Montreal Expos, New York Yankees and Milwaukee Brewers of Major League Baseball (MLB) in parts of six seasons spanning 1994–2001. Listed at 6' 3", 205 lb., he batted and threw right handed.

Career
Born in Ciudad Bolívar, Pérez started his professional baseball career in the Venezuelan League as a 19-year-old rookie during the 1988–1989 season. He was signed by the Blue Jays organization as an amateur free agent in 1989.

In a six-season career, Pérez posted a batting average of .254 (126-for-497) with eight home runs and 74 runs batted in in 221 games, including 49 runs, 19 doubles, one triple and three stolen bases.

In 2007 and 2008 Pérez played in the Mexican League, batting over .300 both years. He also spent time in Nippon Professional Baseball (NPB) and  Korea Baseball Organization (KBO) while playing for the Orix BlueWave (1999) and the Lotte Giants (2003–2004, 2007), respectively, and played with the Novara United of the Italian Baseball League during the 2011 season. In 2003, he tried to make a comeback to the majors by signing a minor league deal with the Seattle Mariners, was released at the end of spring training.

Besides, Pérez spent his entire 27-season career in the Venezuelan League with the Cardenales de Lara club between the 1989-90 and 2014-15 tournaments to become a living legend in his country, where he is nicknamed El Hombre Historia (The History Man). Such a nickname comes from the fact he set several all-time records in Venezuelan baseball history, including for the most home runs (125), RBIs (738), doubles (222) extra-base hits (382) and game appearances (1,300).

See also
 List of Major League Baseball players from Venezuela

References

External links

Retrosheet
Venezuelan Professional Baseball League statistics
 Solo Deportes – Article about a Robert Perez game ( Spanish)

1969 births
Living people
Cardenales de Lara players
Columbus Clippers players
Diablos Rojos del México players
Dorados de Chihuahua players
Dunedin Blue Jays players
Indianapolis Indians players
Knoxville Blue Jays players
Leones de Yucatán players
Lotte Giants players
Major League Baseball outfielders
Major League Baseball players from Venezuela
Milwaukee Brewers players
Montreal Expos players
Myrtle Beach Blue Jays players
New York Yankees players
Novara United players
Orix BlueWave players
People from Bolívar (state)
Piratas de Campeche players
St. Catharines Blue Jays players
Seattle Mariners players
Syracuse Chiefs players
Tecolotes de Nuevo Laredo players
Tennessee Smokies players
Toronto Blue Jays players
Venezuelan expatriate baseball players in Canada
Venezuelan expatriate baseball players in Italy
Venezuelan expatriate baseball players in Japan
Venezuelan expatriate baseball players in Mexico
Venezuelan expatriate baseball players in South Korea
Venezuelan expatriate baseball players in the United States
World Baseball Classic players of Venezuela
2006 World Baseball Classic players